Giuseppe Arrighi (1642 in Volterra – 1706 in Volterra) was an Italian painter of the Baroque period.

He trained as a pupil of Baldassare Franceschini. He painted mainly religious works in local churches, including the church of Sant’Andrea, San Pietro, San Francesco, San Giusto, and San Michele. He was buried in the church of the Ospedale. Arrhigi painted an altarpiece of Saints Antonio da Padua, Dominic, Thomas Acquinas, and Francis of Assisi for the Pieve of Santa Maria at Chianni. He also painted a ''St Anthony of Padua for the Cathedral of Volterra.

References

17th-century Italian painters
Italian male painters
18th-century Italian painters
1642 births
1706 deaths
People from Volterra
Italian Baroque painters
Painters from Tuscany
18th-century Italian male artists